McMullen County Independent School District is a public school district based in the community of Tilden, Texas (USA). The district's boundaries parallel that of McMullen County.

The district has one campus, the McMullen County School, which serves students in grades pre-kindergarten through twelve.

In 2009, the school district was rated "academically acceptable" by the Texas Education Agency.

References

External links
 

School districts in McMullen County, Texas